Mona Guérin (October 9, 1934 – December 30, 2011) was a Haitian educator and writer.

Life 
The daughter of Gontran Rouzier and Camille Duplessy, she was born Mona Rouzier in Port-au-Prince. She studied with the Sœurs de Saint-Joseph de Cluny and at the Pensionnat Sainte-Rose de Lima in Port-au-Prince. She received a bursary from the Canada Arts Council which allowed her to study contemporary literature at Saint Paul University in Ottawa. On her return to Haiti, she married Joseph Guérin, an engineer; the couple had two daughters. She taught school from 1965 to 1980.

From 1961 to 1965, she wrote a weekly column for Le Nouvelliste. Guérin also wrote scripts for the television series Gala de Galerie which appeared on Télé-Haïti from 1977 to 1981 and for the radio series Roye ! Les Voilà which was broadcast from 1982 to 1994. She was host of the radio program Dieu à tout moment (1992-1994) and also wrote about sixty episodes for the radio series Petit théâtre de Magik-Stéréo.

In 1983, she was named a Chevalier in the French Ordre des Palmes Académiques.

Guérin died in Port-au-Prince at the age of 77 after contracting pneumonia.

Selected works

Theatre 
 ’Oiseau de ces dames (1966)
 Les Cinq Chéris (1969)
 La Pieuvre (1971)
 Chambre 26 (1973)
 Sylvia (1974)
 La Pension Vacher (1976)

Other works 
 Sur les vieux thèmes, poetry (1958)
 Mi-figue, mi-raisin, stories (1998), received the Prix littéraire des Caraïbes from the

References 

1934 births
2011 deaths
Haitian women dramatists and playwrights
Haitian women poets
Haitian screenwriters
Haitian journalists
Chevaliers of the Ordre des Palmes Académiques
People from Port-au-Prince
20th-century Haitian poets
20th-century Haitian dramatists and playwrights
20th-century Haitian women writers